The following lists events that happened during 1959 in Australia.

Incumbents

Monarch – Elizabeth II
Governor-General – Sir William Slim
Prime Minister –  Robert Menzies
Chief Justice – Sir Owen Dixon

State Premiers
Premier of New South Wales – Joseph Cahill (until 22 October), then Robert Heffron
Premier of South Australia – Sir Thomas Playford
Premier of Queensland – Frank Nicklin
Premier of Tasmania – Eric Reece
Premier of Western Australia – Albert Hawke (until 2 April), then David Brand
Premier of Victoria – Henry Bolte

State Governors
Governor of New South Wales – Sir Eric Woodward
Governor of Queensland – Sir Henry Abel Smith
Governor of South Australia – Sir Robert George
Governor of Tasmania – Thomas Corbett, 2nd Baron Rowallan (from 21 October)
Governor of Victoria – Sir Dallas Brooks
Governor of Western Australia – Sir Charles Gairdner

Events
 26 January (Australia Day) – Darwin was granted city status
 12 February – The Melbourne outdoor performance venue the Sidney Myer Music Bowl is officially opened by Prime Minister Robert Menzies.
 15 February – American evangelist Billy Graham begins a tour of Australia.
 February – major floods in Queensland
 March – formal construction of the Sydney Opera House began
 4 June – the Soviet embassy in Canberra was reopened.  It had been closed since 29 April 1954 as a result of the Petrov Affair
 29 July – Qantas launched its first jet service from Sydney to San Francisco via Nadi and Honolulu.
 August and September – Princess Alexandra toured Australia 
 September – Australian National University building an "Atom Smasher" 
23 September the M/S Princess of Tasmania Australia's first passenger Roll-on/roll-off diesel ferry makes maiden voyage across Bass Strait.
 November – Donald Bradman batted for 15 minutes in a demonstration.  He retired from cricket.

Arts and literature

 William Dobell wins the Archibald Prize with a portrait of Dr Edward MacMahon
 The Big Fellow by Vance Palmer wins the Miles Franklin Literary Award

Film
On the Beach starring Gregory Peck and Ava Gardner was shot around Melbourne.  The film was based on the novel by Nevil Shute.

Television
Six O'Clock Rock screened on the Australian Broadcasting Commission's channel.  It was compered by Johnny O'Keefe and was the ABC's response to Bandstand on Channel Nine.

Adelaide's first television station, NWS-9, begins broadcasting on 5 September

Sport

 Cricket
 New South Wales won the Sheffield Shield
 England toured Australia in the summer of 1958/59 for The Ashes; Australia won the series 4–0.
 Football
 Brisbane Rugby League premiership: Northern Suburbs defeated Brothers 24–18
 New South Wales Rugby League premiership: St. George defeated Manly–Warringah 20–0
 South Australian National Football League premiership: won by Port Adelaide
 Victorian Football League premiership: Melbourne defeated Essendon 115–78
 Golf
 Australian Open: won by Kel Nagle
 Horse Racing
 Regal Wench wins the Caulfield Cup
 Noholme wins the Cox Plate
 Fine and Dandy wins the Golden Slipper
 Macdougal wins the Melbourne Cup
 Motor Racing
 Jack Brabham wins the 1959 Formula One Drivers' Championship
 The Australian Grand Prix was held at Longford, Tasmania and won by Stan Jones driving a Maserati
 Tennis
 Australian Open men's singles: Alex Olmedo defeats Neale Fraser 6–1 6–2 3–6 6–3
 Australian Open women's singles: Mary Carter defeats Renee Schuurman 6–2 6–3
 Davis Cup: Australia defeats the United States 3–2 in the 1959 Davis Cup final
 Yachting
 Solo takes line honours and Cherana  wins on handicap in the Sydney to Hobart Yacht Race

Births
 8 January – Mike Harwood, golfer
 29 January – Nick Xenophon, lawyer and politician
 31 January – Anthony LaPaglia, actor
 8 February – Andrew Hoy, equestrian rider
 12 February – Sigrid Thornton, actress
 24 February – Mike Whitney, cricketer
 5 March – Colleen Noonan, mother
 25 April – Jennifer Margaret Le Cussan, Botanist
 5 June – Mark Ella, rugby union player
 21 July – Paul Vautin, rugby league footballer, coach and media personality
 26 July – Gary Honey, long jumper
 29 July – Gene Miles, rugby league footballer of the 1980s and 1990s
 12 August – Kerry Boustead, rugby league footballer
 19 August – Rodney Adler, businessman
 30 August – Mark "Jacko" Jackson, footballer and actor
 12 September – Brad Dalton, basketball player
 6 October – Robyn Maher, basketball player
 11 October – Wayne Gardner, motorcycle and touring car racer
 24 October – Rowland S. Howard, musician (died 2009)
 4 September – Kevin Harrington, Australian actor
 4 November – Mark Speakman, politician
 13 November – Anne Manning, racewalker
 1 December – Wally Lewis, rugby league footballer and coach
 12 December – Christine Stanton, high jumper
 15 December – Greg Matthews, cricketer

Deaths
 22 February – Harold Hardwick (born 1888), freestyle swimmer
 20 June – Sir Ian Clunies Ross (b. 1899), scientist
 21 July – Lydia Abell (b. 1872), military nurse, recipient of Royal Red Cross (RRC)
 8 August – Albert Namatjira (b. 1902), Aboriginal artist
 19 September – Arthur Hennessy (b. 1876), Australia's first rugby league captain
 14 October – Errol Flynn (b. 1909), actor (died in Canada)
 14 October – Jack Davey (b. 1907), radio comedian and quiz show host
 22 October – Joseph Cahill (b. 1891), Premier of New South Wales (1952–1959)
 2 November – Michael Considine (b. 1885), politician
 11 November – Charles Chauvel (b. 1897), filmmaker
 24 November – Dally Messenger (b. 1883), rugby union and league footballer
 18 December – Edouard Borovansky (b. 1902), Czech born ballet dancer and choreographer; founder of the Borovansky Australian Ballet

See also 
 1959 in Australian television
 List of Australian films of the 1950s

References 

 
Australia
Years of the 20th century in Australia